Sarh is a city in Chad.

Sarh may also refer to:

 Sarh (crater), impact crater on Mars
 Sarh, Kanpur, a town in Uttar Pradesh, India
 Semi-active radar homing (SARH), a type of missile guidance system

See also
 Sarah (disambiguation)